The Meritorious Unit Citation is a collective group decoration awarded to members of Australian military units. It recognises sustained outstanding service in warlike operations. The Meritorious Unit Citation was created in 1991, along with the Unit Citation for Gallantry.

Description
The frame surrounds a ribbon bar of old gold, which may display a rhodium plated,  diameter, sterling silver Federation Star on its centre.

Members attached to the unit when the citation is awarded wear it with the Federation Star, and continue to wear this after leaving the unit. Members who subsequently join the unit wear the citation without the Federation Star, and discontinue wearing it after leaving the unit.

Recipients
  – 4 November 1991
  For meritorious operational service in the Persian Gulf during enforcement of sanctions in support of United Nations Security Council Resolutions and the subsequent period of hostilities against Iraq to liberate Kuwait in 1990–91.
  – 4 November 1991
  For meritorious operational service in the Persian Gulf during enforcement of sanctions in support of United Nations Security Council Resolutions and the subsequent period of hostilities against Iraq to liberate Kuwait in 1990–91.
  Clearance Diving Team 3 – 4 November 1991
 For meritorious service in clearing Kuwaiti ports of mines, explosive devices and ordnance during the period 27 January to 11 May 1991.
 3 Squadron, Special Air Service Regiment – 25 March 2000
 For sustained outstanding service in warlike operations of the Special Air Service Regiment of the Response Force for Operation Warden.
 No. 2 Airfield Defence Squadron – 25 March 2000
 For sustained outstanding service in warlike operations in support of the International Force for East Timor on Operations Operation Warden and Operation Stabilise.
 Task Group 645.1.1 – 25 March 2000
 For sustained outstanding service in warlike operations in support of the International Force for East Timor during Operation Stabilise.
 10th Force Support Battalion – 26 January 2002
 For sustained outstanding service in the provision of logistic support to warlike operations in East Timor.
 No. 84 Wing Detachment Manas – 29 September 2002
 For outstanding service during warlike operations over the Afghanistan area of operation from March to September 2002 during Operation Slipper.
 No. 3 Squadron RNZAF – 15 November 2002
 For sustained outstanding service in the support of the peacekeeping operations whilst deployed in East Timor.
 Special Air Service Regiment – 19 December 2002
 For sustained outstanding service in warlike operations in Afghanistan in support of the International Coalition against Terrorism.
  – 27 November 2003
 For sustained outstanding service in warlike operations in the Middle East Area of Operations between February and May 2003 whilst deployed on Operation Falconer.
  – 27 November 2003
 For meritorious service in warlike operations in the war against weapons of mass destruction, Iraq, during Operation Bastille and Operation Falconer between February and May 2003.
 Clearance Diving Team 3 – 27 November 2003
 For sustained outstanding service in warlike conditions during Operation Bastille and Operation Falconer against Iraq between February and May 2003.
 No. 75 Squadron RAAF – 27 November 2003
 For sustained outstanding service during warlike operations, in the Middle East Area of operations, over Iraq during Operation Falconer.
 No. 1 Combat Communications Squadron – 27 November 2003
 For sustained outstanding service in warlike operations in providing expeditionary communication and information systems support during Operations Bastille and Operation Falconer.
 Task Group 633.4.2 – 14 September 2004
 For sustained outstanding service in warlike operations in providing air traffic control at Baghdad International Airport during Operation Falconer and Operation Catalyst.
 Australian Medical Detachment (Balad) – 12 June 2006
 For meritorious service and outstanding professional competency in the provision of health care in support of the United States Air Force Theatre Hospital, Balad, Iraq during Operation Catalyst between 4 May 2005 and 28 September 2005.
  – 26 January 2007
 For meritorious operational service in the Northern Arabian  Gulf during Operation Catalyst from 1 November 2005 to 25 March 2006 while conducting maritime security operations in support of the Australian Government's contribution to the rehabilitation and rebuilding of Iraq.
 Australian Medical Detachment (Balad) – 26 January 2007
 For sustained outstanding service and professional competency in the provision of health care in support of the United States Air Force Theatre Hospital, Balad, Iraq during Operation Catalyst from 1 September 2004 to 3 May 2005 inclusive and from 29 September 2005 to 31 December 2005 inclusive.
 5th Aviation Regiment – 27 November 2007
 For sustained meritorious service during warlike and peace support missions in support of Operation Warden, Operation Tanager and Operation Slipper.
 Mentoring Task Force-1 – 13 June 2011
 For sustained outstanding service in warlike operations on Operation Slipper in Uruzgan Province, Afghanistan, between 20 January and 30 October 2010.
92 Wing RAAF – 11 Jul 2013
For sustained outstanding service in warlike operations on Operation Falconer, Operation Catalyst and Operation Slipper from 2003 to 2012.
 Force Communications Unit, Australian Defence Force – 26 January 2014
 For sustained outstanding service in warlike operations through the provision of communications support to the United Nations Transitional Authority in Cambodia from 15 March 1992 to 7 October 1993. 
 1st Joint Movement Group – 26 January 2015
 For sustained and outstanding warlike operational service in the Middle East Area of Operations over the period November 2001 to June 2014. 
 The 1st Joint Movement Group was continuously deployed for 13 years and provided sustained and outstanding service to the Australian Defence Force and supporting Australian government agencies by successfully enabling the force projection, sustainment and re-deployment of all force elements to and from the Middle East as part of Operations FALCONER, BASTILLE, CATALYST, SLIPPER, KRUGER, RIVERBANK and PALATE.
 Task Force 66 (Special Operations Task Groups IV – XX) – 26 January 2015
 For sustained and outstanding warlike operational service in Afghanistan from 30 April 2007 to 31 December 2013, through the conduct of counter insurgency operations in support of the International Security Assistance Force. 
 Over a six-year period, Task Force 66 rendered outstanding service on operations in Afghanistan where it conducted highly successful counter insurgency operations within Uruzgan and surrounding provinces in support of the International Security Assistance Force. The Task Force's outstanding performance against an unrelenting, cunning and ruthless enemy, in an unforgiving environment, was achieved through the collective efforts of every member of the contingent over the duration of the commitment. The superior combat operations results of Task Group 66 further emphasised the Group's exceptional courage and commitment.
Acting on a recommendation of the Brereton War Crimes inquiry, Chief of the Defence Force General Angus Campbell wrote to the Governor-General David Hurley recommending that this award be revoked. In April 2021, Defence Minister Peter Dutton revoked this decision, but stated that those who have a conviction, or a finding of inappropriate behaviour, will have their citation revoked.
 No. 5 Flight RAAF – 13 June 2016
 For sustained outstanding service in warlike operations through the provision of Intelligence, Surveillance and Reconnaissance capability on Operation SLIPPER, over the period January 2010 to November 2014.
 No. 36 and No. 37 Squadron RAAF – 13 June 2016
 For sustained outstanding service in warlike operations throughout the Middle East Area of Operations over the period January 2002 to June 2014.
 Australian Service Contingents 1 and 2 – 25 July 2019
 ''For sustained outstanding service in warlike operations as part of the United Nations Assistance Mission in Rwanda II on Operation TAMAR, over the period July 1994 to March 1996.'

See also
Australian Honours Order of Precedence

References

External links
It's an Honour – Meritorious Unit Citation
ADF Honours and Awards – Unit Citations

Military awards and decorations of Australia
Courage awards
1991 establishments in Australia
Awards established in 1991